William Alfred Robinson (18 September 1938 – 3 March 2014) was a British professional and catch wrestler, wrestling instructor and trainer. Robinson was one of the few wrestlers who was successful in several continents (Europe, North America, Asia and Oceania), winning titles in promotions nearly everywhere he wrestled. One of the leading practitioners of catch wrestling and a seven-time world champion, Robinson is considered to be one of the greatest professional wrestlers of all time, with legendary champion Lou Thesz once saying he was the greatest ever. Robinson was also well known in Japan where he trained mixed martial artists and professional wrestlers in catch wrestling.

Professional wrestling career

Early days in Europe
Robinson began his amateur wrestling career in Britain in 1955. He was the British National Wrestling Champion in 1957, and in 1958 he was the European Open Wrestling Champion in the light heavyweight class, beating an Olympic bronze medal winner in the finals. Billy Robinson also attended the fabled wrestling gym of legendary trainer Billy Riley in Wigan, (nicknamed the "Snake Pit" - years later, affiliate "Snake Pit" gyms would later be established in Japan and the United States.) Riley's Gym was one of the most respected catch wrestling training schools in all of the world. Legends such as Karl Gotch had trained in catch wrestling with Riley at his gym. Lou Thesz also briefly trained at his gym. Robinson had to survive bare minimum amenities (luxuries such as a toilet were not provided at Riley's Gym), a very rough training environment (Riley was very impatient with those who showed even the slightest bit of weakness on the mat) and rigorous conditioning. Robinson stayed at the "Snake Pit" for eight years.

As a professional wrestler, Robinson was an undefeated double-crown British and European Heavyweight Champion for Joint Promotions. In 1963, Robinson fought at the Royal Albert Hall in a match that was attended by Prince Philip. He later defeated older fellow Snake Pit wrestler Billy Joyce for the European title on 12 June 1965 and then beat Joyce again for the British title on 18 January 1967, vacating both titles in 1970 when he went off to America. He also had a high-profile feud with legendary masked wrestler Kendo Nagasaki. In 1978, Robinson made a brief homecoming tour of the UK including a televised win over Lee Bronson.

In North America
Robinson traveled to North America in 1969 for Stu Hart's Stampede Wrestling where he defeated Archie "The Stomper" Gouldie to earn a title shot at NWA World Heavyweight champion Dory Funk Jr. Soon afterwards, he began wrestling for Verne Gagne's American Wrestling Association. He was one of the most successful wrestlers of the American promotion known for hiring the "Real Deals" in wrestling. Billy Robinson was also the AWA British Empire Heavyweight Champion; he defended the title in both the United States and Canada, winning on 3 occasions. On 12 October 1974, Robinson's image as a legitimate wrestler landed him a role in the film The Wrestler alongside Verne Gagne and Ed Asner. He wrestled in Montreal in 1982 and 1983 becoming the International Champion beating Dino Bravo and was also International Tag Team champions with Pierre Mad Dog Lefebvre. He wrestled to a 60-minutes time-limit draw against then WWF Champion Bob Backlund in 1982 as well in Montreal.

Japan
Robinson travelled to Japan where he became immensely popular as a legitimate wrestler versed in submission holds. He participated in a professional wrestling match against legendary Antonio Inoki in 1975. The match was billed as "The Match Between the World's Top Two Technicians" by the Japanese press. Robinson continued an active professional wrestling career, travelling throughout the world to participate in various events. Japanese professional wrestlers learned the art of "hooking" and "shooting" from two other catch wrestling icons, Karl Gotch and Lou Thesz. The new movement led to the formation of the Universal Wrestling Federation. The UWF had wrestlers like Yoshiaki Fujiwara who had also been to the Snake Pit in Wigan. Robinson became a part of the shoot style movement when he wrestled in an exhibition match for the UWFi against fellow AWA legend Nick Bockwinkel on 8 May 1992.

Post-retirement
Robinson, having previously trained wrestlers in England including Marty Jones and Johnny Saint, began training wrestlers in catch wrestling at the UWF Snake Pit in Japan, including James Maritato, Kazushi Sakuraba and El Signo. Robinson was inducted into the International Wrestling Hall of Fame in 2003.

Death
Robinson died on 3 March 2014, at the age of 75 and was buried three days later.

Notable students

 Bob Bruggers
 Brad Rheingans
 Buddy Rose
 El Signo
 Gary Albright
 Gentleman Jack Gallagher
 Hideki Suzuki
 Nunzio
 Johnny Saint
 Josh Barnett
 Kazushi Sakuraba
 Kiyoshi Tamura
 Marty Jones
 Ric Flair
 Rusher Kimura
 Shayna Baszler
 Shigeo Miyato
 The Iron Sheik

Books
Top 100 Pro Wrestlers of All Time: Wrestling's Observer's, Winding Stair Press 2002  
Say Uncle! Catch-As-Catch--Can and the Roots of Mixed Martial Arts, Pro Wrestling, and Modern Grappling, ECW Press 2011 
The Pro Wrestling Hall of Fame: Heroes and Icons, ECW Press 2012 
Physical Chess: My Life in Catch-as-Catch-Can Wrestling, ECW Press 2021
The Wrestlers' Wrestlers: The Masters of the Craft of Professional Wrestling, ECW Press 2021

Championships and accomplishments

Amateur wrestling
British National Wrestling Championship (1 time)
European Open Light Heavyweight Wrestling Championship (1 time)

Professional wrestling
All Japan Pro Wrestling
NWA United National Championship (1 time)
PWF World Heavyweight Championship (1 time)
2 January Korakuen Hall Heavyweight Battle Royal (1980)
World's Strongest Tag Determination League Technique Award (1978) - with Wild Angus
World's Strongest Tag Determination League Technique Award (1980) - with Les Thornton
American Wrestling Association
AWA British Empire Heavyweight Championship (3 times)
AWA World Tag Team Championship (2 times) - with Verne Gagne (1) and Crusher Lisowski (1)
Cauliflower Alley Club
Other honoree (1994)
Championship Wrestling from Florida
NWA Southern Heavyweight Championship (Florida version) (1 time)
Continental Wrestling Association
CWA World Heavyweight Championship (3 times)
George Tragos/Lou Thesz Professional Wrestling Hall of Fame
Class of 2002
International Wrestling Enterprise
IWA World Heavyweight Championship (2 times)
IWE World Series (1968)
IWE World Series (1970)
International Professional Wrestling Hall of Fame
Class of 2022
Joint Promotions
British Heavyweight Championship (1 time)
European Heavyweight Championship (1 time)
Lutte Internationale
Canadian International Heavyweight Championship (2 times)
Canadian International Tag Team Championship (1 time) - with Pierre Lefebvre
New Japan Pro-Wrestling
Greatest 18 Club inductee
Greatest Gaijin Best Bout Section (2002) vs. Antonio Inoki
Professional Wrestling Hall of Fame and Museum
Class of 2011
Pro Wrestling Illustrated
PWI Most Popular Wrestler of the Year (1974)
Ranked No. 151 of the top 500 singles wrestlers of the "PWI Years" in 2003
Stampede Wrestling
Stampede Wrestling Hall of Fame (Class of 1995)
Tokyo Sports
Match of the Year Award (1975) vs. Antonio Inoki on 11 December
World Championship Wrestling (Australia)
IWA World Heavyweight Championship (1 time)
Wrestling Observer Newsletter
Wrestling Observer Newsletter Hall of Fame (Class of 1996)

References

External links

Scientific Wrestling's Certification Camp where Billy has coached since 2007

International Wrestling Hall of Fame
Website of the film 'Catch - the hold not taken', a documentary on the history of Riley's gym where Robinson trained

 

1938 births
2014 deaths
British catch wrestlers
English male professional wrestlers
Professional Wrestling Hall of Fame and Museum
Professional wrestling trainers
The Heenan Family members
Stampede Wrestling alumni
Expatriate professional wrestlers in Japan
20th-century professional wrestlers
AWA World Tag Team Champions
NWA Canadian Heavyweight Champions (Calgary version)
Stampede Wrestling North American Heavyweight Champions
NWA United National Champions
IWA World Heavyweight Champions (Australia)
PWF World Heavyweight Champions